The Dance Music Hall of Fame was an organization established in 2003 to honor and remember significant contributors to the genre of dance music. It had its first inductions in 2004 but went inactive after the 2005 induction ceremony.

History
The Dance Music Hall of Fame was created in 2003 when music industry veteran John Parker (Robbins Entertainment) thought that something needed to be done to honor the creators and innovators of dance music. He enlisted the help of Eddie O'Loughlin (Next Plateau Records) initially and then they brought Daniel Glass (Glassworks), Tom Silverman (Tommy Boy Records) & Brian Chin (noted dance music writer/historian) in to form the organization. The Dance Music Hall of Fame recognizes the contributions of those who have had a significant impact on the evolution and development of dance music and celebrates the history and significance of the genre.

Artists, Producers, Record, Remixer and DJs that helped to shape the dance music industry become eligible for induction 25 years after their first contribution or record release.  Criteria include the influence and significance of the nominee's contributions to dance music.
The Dance Music Hall Of Fame Board of Advisers was composed of dance music professionals, historians and journalists. When the nominees were selected the ballots were sent to an international voting committee of over 1,000 dance music experts. An awards ceremony announcing the inductees in the Dance Music Hall Of Fame would take place annually at a formal dinner event in New York.

Due to financial differences among the Board members, The Dance Music Hall of Fame ceased operations after its second ceremony in 2005.

First board
2004 - Dance Music Hall of Fame (DMHoF) Board of Directors: Daniel Glass, Eddie O'Loughlin, John Parker, Tom Silverman.

2004 - Board of Advisers: Marty Angelo, John "Jellybean" Benitez, Joey Carvello, Mel Cheren, Michael Ellis, Dimitri from Paris, Tony Humphries, Frankie Knuckles, Jurgen Korduletsch, Brad LeBeau, John Luongo, Guy Moot, Michael Paoletta, Vince Pellegrino, Cory Robbins, Pete Tong, Cary Vance, Louie Vega, Pete Waterman, Judy Weinstein, Brian Chin.

Inductees

Artists
 Chic (2005)
 Sylvester (2005)
 Gloria Gaynor (2005)
 Bee Gees (2004)
 Donna Summer (2004)
 Barry White (2004)

Records
 "Disco Inferno" - The Trammps (2005)
 "Good Times" - Chic (2005)
 "Got to Be Real" - Cheryl Lynn (2005)
 "Stayin' Alive" - Bee Gees (2005)
 "I Will Survive" - Gloria Gaynor (2005)
 "I Feel Love" - Donna Summer (2004)
 "Don't Leave Me This Way" - Thelma Houston (2004)
 "Love Is the Message" - MFSB (2004)
 "You Make Me Feel (Mighty Real)" - Sylvester (2004)
 "Shame" - Evelyn "Champagne" King (2004)

Producers
 Bernard Edwards (2005)
 Kenny Gamble (2005)
 Nile Rodgers (2005)
 Leon Huff (2005)
 Quincy Jones (2005)
 Pete Bellotte (2004)
 Giorgio Moroder (2004)

DJs
 John "Jellybean" Benitez (2005)
 Francois Kevorkian (2005)
 Frankie Knuckles (2005)
 Larry Levan (2004)
 David Mancuso (2004)
 Tee Scott (2004)

Remixers
 Francois Kevorkian (2005)
 Tom Moulton (2004)

The Board of Directors Award for Lifetime Achievement (Non-Performer)
 Mel Cheren (2005)
 Henry Stone (2004)

See also
National Museum of Dance and Hall of Fame

References

External links
Articles
Village Voice story on the 2005 DMHOF Ceremony
Billboard's Kerri Mason on the 2005 Inductees
DMHOF Press Release which details the 2005 Inductees as well as the history of the Dance Music Hall of Fame
Remix Magazine announces the 2004 DMHOF Ceremony
About.com Story on the Dance Music Hall of Fame
Barry Lederer's report on the 2005 DMHOF Dinner

Photos
About.com Photos from 2004 DMHOF Dinner
DiscoMusic.com Photos from 2004 DMHOF Dinner
DJ Spyder's 2005 DMHOF Photos

Video
Dance Music Hall of Fame Awards 2005 Video

Dance music awards
American music awards
Music halls of fame
Music
Awards established in 2003
Arts organizations established in 2003